The Bryant–Cushing House is a historic First Period house at 768 Main Street in Norwell, Massachusetts. The oldest portion of this -story wood-frame house was built c. 1698 by Deacon Thomas Bryant. It is five bays wide and two deep, and has a large central chimney. The main entrance is centered on the front facade, and is flanked by fluted pilasters supporting a pediment. The house was in the locally prominent Cushing family for roughly two hundred years. Much of the land formerly associated with the house now forms part of the adjacent Norris Reservation, conservation land owned by The Trustees of Reservations.

The house was listed on the National Register of Historic Places, and included in the Norwell Village Area Historic District, in 1976.

See also
List of the oldest buildings in Massachusetts
National Register of Historic Places listings in Plymouth County, Massachusetts

References

Houses completed in 1698
Houses in Plymouth County, Massachusetts
Norwell, Massachusetts
National Register of Historic Places in Plymouth County, Massachusetts
Historic district contributing properties in Massachusetts
Houses on the National Register of Historic Places in Plymouth County, Massachusetts
1698 establishments in Massachusetts